The IPSC African Handgun Championship is an IPSC level 4 championship hosted every third year in Africa.

History 
 1994 Pretoria, South Africa
 1997 Pretoria, South Africa
 2000 Johannesburg, South Africa
 2003 Pietersburg, South Africa
 2006 Johannesburg, South Africa
 2009 Polokwane, South Africa
 2012 Bulawayo, Zimbabwe
 2015 Cape Town, South Africa
 2018 Polokwane, South Africa
 2021 South Africa

Champions 
The following is a list of current and past IPSC African Handgun champions.

Overall category

Lady category

Junior category

Senior category

Super Senior category

References

 Match Results - 2003 IPSC African Handgun Championship, South Africa
 Match Results - 2006 IPSC African Handgun Championship, South Africa
 Match Results - 2009 IPSC African Handgun Championship, South Africa
 Match Results - 2012 IPSC African Handgun Championship, Zimbabwe
 Match Results - 2015 IPSC African Handgun Championship, South Africa
 2015 African Handgun Championship results
 IPSC Continental Championships
 Honours Rolls – SAPSA | South African Practical Shooting Association

IPSC shooting competitions
African championships
Shooting sports in Africa